Frank Andrews (June 15, 1864 – December 7, 1936) was the first Assistant Attorney General of Texas.

Frank Andrews, son of Rev. Green Lee and Martha Ann (Sellers) Andrews, was born in Fayetteville, Texas. He received a bachelor's degree from Southwestern University in 1885. He joined the Texas bar in 1887, and served as the first Assistant Attorney General of Texas from 1891-1894.

In 1895 he moved to Houston, Texas to establish a law practice. His major partners over the years included U.S. Congressman Thomas Henry Ball, Austin Appellate Judge Sam Streetman, Melvin Kurth, and Robert Kelly. His practice still bears his name today as Andrews & Kurth, L.L.P.

During Frank Andrew's tenure he represented the Gulf Coast Lines railroad and its reorganization into the New Orleans, Texas & Mexico Railroad. He also helped found the Bankers Trust Company and Union National Bank, opened the Union Station in Houston, served as Draft Board Chairman during World War I, won the first two million USD judgement in Texas in a receivership case, represented the Federal National Mortgage Corporation and Reconstruction Finance Corporation as part of FDR's New Deal, and organized General Crude Oil Company.

External links
 David Young's Genealogy Pages
 Andrews & Kurth L.L.P.
 Google Finance
 Findlaw

 Texas Adjutant General Service Records
 Answers

1864 births
1936 deaths
Southwestern University alumni
Texas lawyers
Politicians from Houston
People from Fayette County, Texas
Lawyers from Houston